Yida is a settlement and refugee camp in Unity state, South Sudan. In 2011 it had 20,000 people. As of June 2012, it has over 50,000. Yida is located in wetland, 12 km from border with Sudan.

In the rainy season it is "virtually an island".

Since 2016, and in line with The Government of South Sudan's policy, UNHCR and partners have been actively engaged in relocating refugees from Yida to Jamjang camps, where refugees can receive multisectoral assistance

References

Unity (state)
Refugee camps in South Sudan